or  is the administrative centre of Hattfjelldal Municipality in Nordland county, Norway. The Norwegian National Road 73 runs through the village.

Hattfjelldal Church and Hattfjelldal Airport are both located in the village.  The headquarters for the company Arbor-Trading AS has been located in this village since 1957.  The Southern Sami cultural centre, is located in the village as well.

References

Hattfjelldal
Villages in Nordland